Category 4 is the second-highest classification on the Australian tropical cyclone intensity scale which is used to classify tropical cyclones, that have 10-minute sustained winds of at least wind speeds of .  47 tropical cyclones have peaked Category 4 severe tropical cyclones in the Australian tropical cyclone basin, which is denoted as a part of the Indian and Pacific Oceans to the south of the equator and between 90°E - 160°E. The earliest tropical cyclone to be classified as a Category 4 severe tropical cyclone was Gyan which was classified as a Category 4 during December 22, 1981, as it impacted New Caledonia. The latest was Pola as it passed between Fiji and Tonga. This list does include any tropical cyclones that peaked as a Category 5 severe tropical cyclone, while in the Australian region.

Background
The Australian region tropical cyclone basin is located to the south of the Equator between 90°E and 160°E. The basin is officially monitored by the Australian Bureau of Meteorology as well as the Indonesian Agency for Meteorology, Climatology and Geophysics (BMKG), and the Papua New Guinea National Weather Service. The United States Joint Typhoon Warning Center (JTWC) and other national meteorological services such as New Zealand's MetService, Météo-France and the Fiji Meteorological Service, also monitor parts of the basin in an unofficial capacity. This scale is not officially used by any of the warning centres for the region, however, tropical cyclones are compared to it by various agencies including NASA. On both scales Category 5 tropical cyclones are expected to cause widespread devastation, if it significantly impacts land at or near its peak intensity.

Systems

1970s

|-
| Kerry ||  ||  ||  || Wesrern Australia || || ||
|-
| Madge ||  ||  ||  || Northern Territory, Queensland || || ||
|-
| Pam ||  ||  ||  || Wallis and Futuna, VanuatuNew Caledonia, Queensland || Significant || Unknown ||
|-
| Tracy ||  ||  ||  || Northern Territory ||  ||  ||
|-
| Vanessa (1976) || January 1976 ||  ||  || Western Australia || || ||
|-
| Watorea || ||  ||  || || || ||
|-
| Ted ||  ||  ||  || Queensland || || ||
|-
| Leo (1977) || || || || || || ||
|-
| Trudy (1978) || || || || || || ||
|-
| Winnie (1978) || || || || || || ||
|-
| Kerry (1979) || || || || || || ||
|-
| Hazel (1979) || || || || || || ||
|-
| Idylle (1979) || || || || || || ||
|}

1980s

|-
| Brian (1980) || || || || || || ||
|-
| Fred (1980) || || || || || || ||
|-
| Simon ||  ||  ||   || Queensland, New Zealand ||  ||  ||
|-
| Doris-Gloria (1980) || || || || || || ||
|-
| Alice-Adelaide (1980) || || || || || || ||
|-
| Felix (1980) || || || || || || ||
|-
| Neil (1981) || || || || || || ||
|-
| Olga (1981) || || || || || || ||
|-
| Chris-Damia (1982) || || || || || || ||
|-
| Bernie (1982) || || || || || || ||
|-
| Jane ||  ||  ||   || Western Australia ||  ||  ||
|-
| Elinor ||  ||  ||  || Queensland ||  ||  ||
|-
| Quenton (1983) || || || || || || ||
|-
| Bobby (1984) || || || || || || ||
|-
| Chloe (1984) || || || || || || ||
|-
| Daryl (1984) || || || || || || ||
|-
| Odette ||  ||  ||  || Cape York Peninsula, Vanuatu || || ||
|-
| Sandy ||  ||  ||  || Northern Territory, Western Australia || N/A ||  ||
|-
| Victor (1986) || || || || || || ||
|-
| Billy – Lila ||  ||  ||  || Western Australia || None || None ||
|-
| Elsie ||  ||  ||  || Western Australia || N/A ||  ||
|-
| Gwenda-Ezenina (1988) || || || || || || ||
|-
| Ned ||  ||  ||  || Western Australia ||  ||  ||
|}

1990s

|-
| Ivor ||  ||  ||  || Cape York Peninsula ||  || ||
|-
| Joy ||  ||  ||  || Solomon Islands, Queensland ||  ||  ||
|-
| Errol (1991) || || || || || || ||
|-
| Marian (1991) || || || || || || ||
|-
| Betsy || ||  ||  || Solomon Islands, Vanuatu, New Caledonia, New Zealand ||  ||  ||
|-
| Harriet-Heather (1992) || || || || || || ||
|-
| Ian ||  ||  ||  || Western Australia || || ||
|-
| Esau ||  ||  ||  || Vanuatu ||  Minimal ||  ||
|-
| Jane-Irna (1992) || || || || || || ||
|-
| Nina ||  ||  ||  || Queensland, Tonga, Papua New Guinea, Solomon Islands, Wallis and Futuna ||   ||  ||
|-
| Oliver ||  ||  ||  || Queensland || || ||
|-
| Sharon ||  ||  ||  || Indonesia, Western Australia ||  ||  ||
|-
| Annette ||  ||  ||  || Western Australia, South Australia ||  ||  ||
|-
| Bobby ||  ||  ||  || Northern Territory, Western Australia || ||  ||
|-
| Agnes ||  ||  ||  ||  || || ||
|-
| Frank ||  ||  ||  || Western Australia || || ||
|-
| Barry ||  ||  ||  || Queensland ||  ||  ||
|-
| Kirsty ||  ||  ||  || Western Australia || || ||
|-
| Olivia ||  ||  ||  || Western Australia, South Australia ||  ||  ||
|-
| Drena (1997) || || || || || || ||
|-
| Rhonda ||  ||  ||  || Cocos Islands, Western Australia || || ||
|-
| Katrina ||  ||  ||  || Solomon Islands, Vanuatu, Queensland ||  ||  || 
|-
| Tiffany (1998) || || || || || || ||
|-
| Elaine ||  ||  ||  || Western Australia || || ||
|-
| Frederic-Evrina (1999) || || || || || || ||
|}

2000s

|-
| Norman (2000) || || || || || || ||
|-
| Fiona (2003) || || || || || || ||
|-
| Monty ||  ||  ||  || Western Australia || ||
|-
| Oscar-Itseng (2004) || || || || || || ||
|-
| Bertie-Alvin (2005) || || || || || || ||
|-
| Larry ||  ||  ||  || Queensland ||  || ||
|-
| Floyd (2006) || || || || || || ||
|-
| Pancho (2008) || || || || || || ||
|-
| Billy (2008) || || || || || || ||
|-
| Ilsa (2009) || || || || || || ||

|}

2010's

|-
| Ului ||  ||  ||  || Vanuatu, Solomon Islands, Queensland ||  ||  ||
|-
| Zelia ||  ||  ||  || None ||  ||  ||
|-
| Bianca ||  ||  ||  || Western Australia ||  ||  ||
|-
| Narelle ||  ||  ||  || Western Australia ||  ||  ||
|-
| Rusty ||  ||  ||  || Western Australia ||  ||  ||
|-
| Christine ||  ||  ||  || Western Australia ||  ||  ||
|-
| Lam ||  ||  ||  || Northern Australia ||  ||  ||
|-
| Nathan ||  ||  ||  || Northern Australia ||  ||  ||
|-
| Ikola ||  ||  ||  || None ||  ||  ||
|-
| Quang ||  ||  ||  || Western Australia ||  ||  ||
|-
| Debbie ||  ||  ||  || Queensland, New South Wales ||  ||  ||
|-
| Savannah ||  ||  ||  || Cocos Islands ||  ||  ||
|-
| Trevor ||  ||  ||  || Papua New Guinea, Queensland, Northern Territory ||  ||  ||
|}

2020's

|-
| Ferdinand ||  ||  ||  || None ||  ||  ||
|-
| Vernon ||  ||  ||  || None ||  ||  ||
|-
| Charlotte ||  ||  ||  || Timor-Leste, Western Australia ||  ||   ||
|-
| Freddy ||  ||  ||  || None ||  ||   ||
|}

Other systems
Chris-Damia - Cat 4 in SWIO.
Walter-Gregoara - Cat 4 in SWIO.
Harriet-Heather - Cat 4 in SWIO.
Uriah - Cat 4 in SWIO.

Over the years, the intensity estimates of tropical cyclones have been reanalysed for various reasons and were found to have been underestimated by the various warning centres. In particular, during a database repair project that took place between 2005 and 2007, the BoM discovered that Severe Tropical Cyclone Pam of 1974, had been reanalysed at some point after 1979. This reanalysis showed that Pam had moved out of the South Pacific region and into the Australian region, as a category 5 severe tropical cyclone. However, a later reanalysis by the BoM during 2021 downgraded it to a category 4 severe tropical cyclone, as it was thought that the width of the southern eyewall was too narrow for a category 5 severe tropical cyclone.

Impacts

Records and statistics

See also
List of Category 5 Atlantic hurricanes
List of Category 5 Pacific hurricanes

References

External links

Australian